Ferocactus cylindraceus is a species of barrel cactus which is known by several common names, including California barrel cactus, Desert barrel cactus, and miner's compass. It was first described by George Engelmann in 1853.

Distribution and habitat
This cactus is native to the eastern Mojave Desert and western Sonoran Desert Ecoregions in: Southern California, Nevada, Arizona, and Utah in the Southwestern United States; and Baja California, and Sonora state in Northwestern Mexico.

Description
Ferocactus cylindraceus is usually cylindrical or spherical, with some older specimens forming columns  in height. It is covered in long, plentiful spines, which are straight and red when new and become curved and gray as they age.

The cactus bears flowers that are maroon outside, and bright yellow inside, with red or yellow centers on the side that faces the sun. The fleshy, hollow fruits are yellow.

Varieties
 Ferocactus cylindraceus cylindraceus— California barrel cactus.
 Ferocactus cylindraceus lecontei (Engelm.) N.P.Taylor — Leconte's barrel cactus.
 Ferocactus cylindraceus tortulispinus (H.E.Gates) N.P.Taylor

Conservation
Having a sculptural form and picturesque qualities, this already uncommon cactus is threatened by plant collectors. It is also losing habitat to clearing for new wind farms and solar power plants in the Mojave Desert and Colorado Desert.

Protected areas with notable populations include
Anza-Borrego Desert State Park
Joshua Tree National Park
Mojave National Preserve
Santa Rosa and San Jacinto Mountains National Monument

References

Gallery

External links

Jepson Manual Treatment — Ferocactus cylindraceus
USDA Plants Profile: Ferocactus cylindraceus (California barrel cactus)
Ferocactus cylindraceus in Flora of North America @ efloras.org
Abdnha.org: species photos
Ferocactus cylindraceus — U.C. Photo gallery

cylindraceus
Cacti of the United States
North American desert flora
Flora of the California desert regions
Flora of Arizona
Flora of Nevada
Flora of Utah
Flora of the Sonoran Deserts
Flora of the Coachella Valley
Natural history of the Colorado Desert
Natural history of the Mojave Desert
Natural history of the Lower Colorado River Valley
Plants described in 1853
Flora without expected TNC conservation status